Bhanwar Singh Shekhawat (भवरसिंह शेखावत)  is an Indian politician and member of the Bharatiya Janata Party. Shekhawat was a former chairman of Apex Bank Madhya Pradesh, and former member of the Madhya Pradesh Legislative Assembly from Badnawar and Indore-5.

References

People from Dhar district
Bharatiya Janata Party politicians from Madhya Pradesh
Madhya Pradesh MLAs 2013–2018
Living people
21st-century Indian politicians
Year of birth missing (living people)